"The Infernal Machine" is the twenty-first episode of the first series of Space: 1999.  The screenplay was written by Anthony Terpiloff and Elizabeth Barrows; the director was David Tomblin.  The final shooting script is dated 11 December 1974.  Live-action filming took place between 20 December 1974 and 9 January 1975.

Story 
As the day watch commences, John Koenig leaves his office and enters Main Mission.  A recent accident has left Paul Morrow with fractured ribs and a broken ankle.  With his second-in-command recuperating in the Medical Centre, Koenig is working even longer hours than normal.  He offers Winters, one of the senior operatives, the opportunity to temporarily assume Morrow's position.  When the man gladly accepts, Koenig adjourns to his quarters for some much-needed rest.  The Commander has scarcely sat down when he hears Winters paging him.  Scanners have detected an unidentified powered object approaching the Moon.

The executive staff gathers to witness the most outlandish spacecraft they have ever encountered.  Measuring a quarter of a mile wide, the crab-like vessel consists of a central hull flanked by two rotating sets of abstract legs.  Amazed, Victor Bergman declares it, like the bumble bee, violates every known rule of aerospace engineering.  Voice contact is established.  The alien requests permission to land, stating it is in need of assistance.  Koenig is suspicious of the stranger's intentions when Computer vocally refuses to provide any information on the vessel; more so when it becomes apparent every word spoken on Alpha is heard by the eavesdropping alien.

Koenig grants permission to land—away from Moonbase Alpha.  The voice acknowledges, but the mammoth craft approaches anyway, coming to a halt on a bluff overlooking the base.  The stranger announces its wish to receive a special delegation, asking for Koenig, Bergman and Helena Russell by name.  Realising they have little choice, the trio drives over to the ship in a moon buggy.  They board and a lift conveys them to the control centre.  The chamber is built on an enormous scale, its complex mechanisms indistinguishable from works of art.  After the doors slam shut behind them, the three are examined by a probing beam of light.

In a curtained-off area, they find an ancient man resting on a couch.  Waking, he introduces himself as 'Companion'.  The alien has no idea who the Alphans are or why they are here—though, he surmises, there are two reasons for which they could have been summoned.  The Alphans assume Companion is senile when he begins speaking to an unseen person he calls Gwent.  This misconception ends when a voice (the same pompous voice which spoke to the Alphans earlier) responds.  After chiding Companion for mishandling the situation, it addresses the Alphans.  Gwent has come in search of resources essential to its continued well being.

A nearby terminal presents the Alphans with a detailed printout.  It seems Gwent requires a large quantity of technical supplies.  Reviewing the list, Koenig doubts they can spare much.  When consulted, Computer replies the order is already prepared and awaiting shipment; Gwent's list was relayed to the Supply Section twenty-three minutes ago.  Angered by this hostile takeover of Moonbase Computer, the Commander demands to see Gwent.  The disembodied voice laughs, telling Koenig he already does.  The Alphans realise the vessel itself is Gwent.  They are aboard a sentient cybernetic intelligence.

Gwent demands the supplies be delivered straight away.  Koenig will only issue the order after he and his team have returned to base.  Distressed by Koenig's disrespectful attitude, Companion gives the Alphans a reality check:  the tyrannical Gwent is his master.  He has grown old while trapped in service to the machine.  Helena notices the elderly man experience a spasm of pain and comes to his aid.  Though clearly ill, Companion stubbornly insists he is well.  Rather desperately, he advises the Alphans to forget their pride, quickly give Gwent what it wants, then leave...while they still can.

When Koenig refuses, Gwent lurches into motion toward Alpha.  Two Eagles move to intercept the machine.  After multiple strafing runs, they learn Gwent is impervious to laser fire.  In retaliation, the alien blasts the mountain range over which the Eagles are flying.  Both ships are engulfed in the resulting explosion.  After the hostilities cease, the Alphans discover Companion has collapsed to the floor.  He is moments from death.  Helena insists she be allowed to take the old man to Alpha for medical treatment.  Gwent irrationally refuses to accept her diagnosis.

As a deathbed confession, Companion reveals he is Gwent's creator.  Over time, as the machine evolved, the negative aspects of its personality became dominant.  The old man pities the Alphans, saddened to leave them at the mercy of his monstrous legacy.  When Companion expires, Gwent responds with deafening sobs of anguish.  Distraught, the machine lumbers off into space.  It soon becomes obvious that Companion's imminent demise was not unexpected; arrangements have been made, and the Alphans place the old man's body in a futuristic coffin.  Gwent begins an emotional eulogy, but is unable to finish.  Koenig concludes the brief service.

Having escaped Gwent's show of force with minor damage, Eagles One and Two pursue the alien machine.  They observe the coffin being ejected into space.  When sensors show the object contains a dead body, the staff assumes a hostage has been executed.  To avoid further retribution, Winters recalls both ships.  Soon after, Gwent returns to the Moon's surface, demanding the supplies.  Koenig insists on assurances that his team will be free to go when the shipment arrives.  When told its word of honour is insufficient, an insulted Gwent hits the Commander with a pain-inducing ray.

Subjected to a prolonged session, Koenig is soon writhing on the floor in agony.  When released, he is defiant, still demanding that guarantee.  Gwent states it finds Koenig's hostility tiring; it must rest.  With that said, the lights dim and the activity of the surrounding machinery diminishes.  Bergman concludes the machine, low on vital resources, is conserving power.  The professor then recalls Companion's statement that they were summoned for two reasons.  Obviously, the supplies are one reason.  The old man's death is the second.  Gwent now requires a new companion.

During Gwent's 'rest', Bergman passes the time examining the alien technology.  Touching an odd device, he suddenly freezes, convulsing as if in contact with a high-voltage electric current.  Koenig and Helena rush to his side, the doctor instantly  seeing he is in heart failure.  The sudden commotion awakens Gwent.  Confused, it probes the three of them with the sensor beam, barking at them to separate.  Only with an unobstructed view of Bergman is the machine able to perceive the emergency:  contact with a force-field has drained the power of the professor's mechanical heart.

Gwent fires a bolt of electricity at Bergman's chest, which recharges the heart's energy cells.  The professor regains consciousness and expresses his gratitude.  Wanting time to formulate a strategy, Koenig mimes for Bergman to engage Gwent in conversation.  While the machine reminisces about Companion, Koenig writes on a nearby table to communicate silently with the others.  He has come to the conclusion that Gwent is blind.  Contacting Main Mission with his commlock, he relays a written order: 'PREPARE'.  Detecting the open frequency, Gwent insists the Alphans deliver his supplies.

As Koenig coolly refuses, he scrawls a final order for his staff:  'ATTACK!'  To stop this mechanical megalomaniac, Koenig hopes to force Gwent into expending its dwindling energy in a fight with the Alphans.  A squadron of combat Eagles engages the alien in battle.  To support the air attack, Winters deploys a number of laser-equipped armoured vehicles under remote control.  Despite mounting losses, the strategy seems to be working.  As Gwent exchanges fire with both the laser tanks and the Eagle task force, the lights in the control centre flicker and dim.

Tiring of the battle, the machine deploys a large-scale version of its punishment ray—this time encompassing the whole of Alpha.  Over the commlock channel, Koenig and company hear the agonised screams of the entire community.  To end their torment, the Commander formally surrenders and the ray is terminated.  Gwent arrogantly presents its terms.  Bergman will be returned to Alpha in exchange for the supplies.  Koenig and Helena, however, will become Gwent's new companions for the rest of their natural lives.  Resigned, Koenig orders the cargo Eagle launched.

The senior staff makes a final effort to free Koenig and the others.  Wary of Gwent's electronic eavesdropping, Alan Carter and a squad of Security guards replace the crew of the cargo Eagle.  Flying over to the massive machine, the ship is taken inside and conveyed to an antechamber adjacent to the control area.  After the cargo is unloaded, Gwent's scanner beam first inspects the containers, then the men—detecting the heavy-duty laser rifles each carries.  Gwent orders them to leave at once; their act of treachery has forfeited Bergman's freedom.

The two parties of Alphans fire at the massive door separating them, but it remains unscathed by their lasers.  Gwent punishes both groups with the pain-inducing rays.  Threatened with death, Carter's group reluctantly leaves.  Koenig and company are sent to fetch the supplies.  With some desperation, Gwent directs the trio to insert a large cylinder of solid fuel into an access port.  They refuse and are again subjected to the punishment rays.  This time, the beams lack much of their former strength.  Koenig rallies, taunting Gwent with this evidence of its waning power.

Gwent demands their cooperation, stating that he is Delmer Powys Plebus Gwent, a person of considerable influence on the planet Zemo.  A scientific genius, he created this cybernetic entity which combined his personality with the superior abilities of a computerised brain.  The machine is impervious to harm and powerful enough to destroy an entire universe.  Koenig reply is fatalistic; Gwent can use its remaining energy to destroy Alpha...but in the end it, too, will perish.  The Commander then hoists the heavy fuel rod over his head and dashes it to the floor.

Uncharacteristically, Gwent's response is one of philosophical self-examination.  Years of roaming the universe blind and dependent on others have left it untrusting and cynical.  Too late, Gwent has realised that this mechanised attempt at immortality has resulted in an empty and isolated existence.  Bergman notes that the desire to preserve oneself is the ultimate expression of vanity, the first and last of all sins.  Agreeing with the professor, Gwent embraces death.  As the machinery shuts down, the Alphans are left trapped in the dark.  Koenig observes the air supply has also stopped; when the oxygen runs out they, too, will die.

Gwent's impregnable construction thwarts any rescue from the outside.  After several hours, the Alphans are suffering from the stale air.  From the shards of the shattered fuel rod, Koenig selects a fragment.  He drags himself over to the fuel port and inserts it.  The machine responds, first with oxygen, then by opening the door.  As the Alphans leave the chamber, Gwent bids its new friends farewell.  By the time Koenig and party have returned to Alpha, Gwent is showing signs of life.  With difficulty, the machine manages to lift off. Flying low, it heads directly for a large mountain on the rim of the crater.

As the Alphans watch, Gwent deliberately crashes into the mountain, utterly destroying itself.  Fixated on the fireball that is Gwent's funeral pyre, a solemn Koenig mutters an epitaph:  'A lonely, blind creature looking for its death.'

Cast

Starring 
 Martin Landau — Commander John Koenig
 Barbara Bain — Doctor Helena Russell

Also Starring 
 Barry Morse — Professor Victor Bergman

Guest Star 
 Leo McKern — Companion and Voice of Gwent

Featuring 
 Clifton Jones — David Kano
 Zienia Merton — Sandra Benes
 Nick Tate — Captain Alan Carter
 Gary Waldhorn — Winters

Uncredited Artists 
 Tony Allyn — Security Guard One
 Quentin Pierre — Security Guard Two
 Sarah Bullen — Kate
 Barbara Kelly — Computer Voice

Music 

In addition to the regular Barry Gray score (drawn primarily from "Breakaway" and "Another Time, Another Place"), a number of library compositions were utilised: 'Outer Space' by Robert Farnon, 'Lunar Landscape' by Roger Roger, 'Mission Control' by Harry Sosnik, 'The Monsters' by Ivo Vyhnalek, 'Dark Suspense No. 1' by Beda Folten, and 'Suspense' by Joe Venuto.  An excerpt from the Thunderbirds score, composed by Gray, was used to score the Alphans' second attack on Gwent.

Production Notes 
 Husband-and-wife writing team Anthony Terpiloff and Elizabeth Barrows based this episode on the 1934 play The Infernal Machine by Jean Cocteau—which itself was based on Sophocles' tragedy Oedipus Rex.  In it, the blinded Oedipus is portrayed as pompous, prideful and arrogant.  To give the story a science-fiction twist, Terpiloff and Barrows made the main character a rampaging cybernetic entity.  The writers hoped to have Sir Ralph Richardson play the dual role of Gwent and Companion; instead, the role went to Australian actor Leo McKern (best known in the genre for his being one of several actors to portray the enigmatic 'Number Two' in the espionage-fantasy series The Prisoner).
 When interviewed, model-builder Martin Bower stated the motorised 'Gwent' miniature used in this episode provided the least happy experience for the Bray Studios' effects crew during production.  With its twin set of rotating legs, it was almost impossible to get a realistic shot of the heavy model rolling across the miniature lunar landscape during the required take-off and touchdown sequences.  At the end of filming, visual effects director Nick Allder picked the five-foot-wide model up bodily and, throwing it across the studio in sheer frustration, destroyed it.  A fourteen-inch version built for distance shots survived.
 Bower also built three different designs of laser tank for the episode, the only time they appear significantly in the series.  All were based on 1/25 scale Tamiya Chieftain tank models.
 During the production of the previous episode "Space Brain", a make-up artist had noted a small lump on actor Prentis Hancock's neck.  That weekend, he went to hospital and the tumour was surgically removed.  Fortunately, the mass was found to be benign.  As "The Infernal Machine" was scheduled to begin filming during his convalescence, Paul Morrow was replaced by the one-off character Winters, portrayed by Gary Waldhorn.

Novelisation 

The episode was adapted in the sixth Year One Space: 1999 novel Astral Quest by John Rankine, published in 1975.  Following the final shooting script, it would include Morrow rather than the substitute character, Winters.

References

External links 
Space: 1999 - "The Infernal Machine" - The Catacombs episode guide
Space: 1999 - "The Infernal Machine" - Moonbase Alpha's Space: 1999 page

1976 British television episodes
Space: 1999 episodes
Adaptations of works by Jean Cocteau
Works based on Oedipus Rex
Modern adaptations of works by Sophocles